Seán "Georgie" Leahy (1938 – 6 June 2017) was an Irish hurling manager, coach, selector and player. His league and championship career with the Kilkenny senior team lasted just one season from 1970 until 1971.

Leahy first played competitive hurling with the James Stephens club in his teens, winning a county junior championship medal in 1955. He progressed onto the senior team and was in the twilight of his club career when he won a county senior championship medal in 1969.

Success at club level saw Leahy come to the attention of the inter-county selectors. He made his debut on the inter-county scene at the age of seventeen when he first linked up with the Kilkenny minor team. An All-Ireland runner-up in this grade, he later joined the senior team during the 1970-71 league. Leahy was an All-Ireland runner-up later that year, however, he won a Leinster medal as a non-playing substitute.

After beginning his coaching career as a sixteen year old, Leahy became more involved in team management and coaching in his retirement from playing. At club level he enjoyed championship and league successes with Galmoy, Tullaroan, Barrow Rangers, Mooncoin, Conahy Shamrocks and Castletown. In 1976 Leahy was the sole trainer, coach and selector when he guided James Stephens to the All-Ireland title. He repeated the feat with Glenmore in 1991, becoming the first person to manage two different clubs to All-Ireland titles.

At inter-county level Leahy enjoyed much success as a coach and a selector at all grades with Kilkenny between 1972 and 1978. With the senior team he was a selector with the All-Ireland-winning teams in 1972, 1974 and 1975. As an under-21 selector he won back-to-back All-Ireland titles in 1974 and 1974, having earlier coached the minor team to the All-Ireland title in 1972. During that same period Leahy was a selector on four Railway Cup-winning Leinster teams.

Leahy later worked as a manager, coach, trainer and selector with numerous inter-county teams, including Waterford, Wexford, Laois, Carlow, Armagh, Antrim, Offaly, Westmeath and Meath.

Career statistics

Honours

As a player

James Stephens
Kilkenny Senior Hurling Championship (1): 1969
Kilkenny Junior Hurling Championship (1): 1955

Kilkenny
Leinster Senior Hurling Championship (1): 1971
Leinster Minor Hurling Championship (1): 1955

In management

James Stephens
All-Ireland Senior Club Hurling Championship (1): 1976
Leinster Senior Club Hurling Championship (1): 1975
Kilkenny Senior Hurling Championship (2): 1975, 1976

Kilkenny
All-Ireland Senior Hurling Championship (3): 1972, 1974, 1975
Leinster Senior Hurling Championship (5): 1972, 1973, 1974, 1975, 1978
All-Ireland Under-21 Hurling Championship (2): 1974, 1975
Leinster Under-21 Hurling Championship (2): 1974, 1975
All-Ireland Minor Hurling Championship (1): 1972
Leinster Minor Hurling Championship (1): 1972

Offaly
Leinster Senior Hurling Championship (1): 1988

Leinster
Railway Cup (4): 1973, 1974, 1975, 1977

References

1938 births
2017 deaths
All-Ireland Senior Club Hurling Championship winning managers
James Stephens hurlers
Kilkenny inter-county hurlers
Hurling managers
Hurling selectors